Hypselodoris maridadilus is a species of colourful sea slug or dorid nudibranch, a marine gastropod mollusk in the family Chromodorididae. It feeds on sponges.

Distribution
This nudibranch is found in the Western Indian Ocean, from South Africa to the Red Sea.

Description
Hypselodoris maridadilus has a white to cream or yellow body with five purple longitudinal lines, and a purple bordered mantle. The gills and rhinophores are bright orange.  It is similar in appearance to Hypselodoris whitei which differs slightly in having white-tipped rhinophores and gills. This species can reach a total length of at least .

References

Chromodorididae
Gastropods described in 1977